The 2009–10 Bahrain First Division League was the 53rd season of top-level football in Bahrain.

Muharraq Club had been the defending champions for the previous four seasons, but lost this championship on the final day to Al-Ahli (Manama).

Structure Changes
The league was reduced from the previous season's 19 to 10 clubs.

Members clubs

Final league table

8th-place play-off

''Al Hala come 8th, Malkiya enter promotion/relegation playoff

Promotion/relegation play-off

Fixtures and results

Bahraini Premier League seasons
1
Bah